Admiral of the Fleet Sir Varyl Cargill Begg,  (1 October 1908 – 13 July 1995) was a Royal Navy officer. He fought in the Second World War as gunnery officer in a cruiser taking part in the North Atlantic convoys, the Norwegian campaign and the occupation of Iceland and then as gunnery officer in a battleship operating in the Mediterranean Fleet during the Battle of Cape Matapan. After that he commanded a destroyer during the Korean War and was Commander-in-Chief of Far East Command during the Indonesia–Malaysia confrontation. He was First Sea Lord and Chief of the Naval Staff in the late 1960s. In that role he vehemently opposed plans to introduce large new aircraft carriers and instead managed to persuade the British Government to develop the design for three small "through-deck cruisers".

Early career
Born the son of Francis Cargill Begg and Muriel Clare Begg (née Robinson), Begg was educated at St Andrew's School, Eastbourne and Malvern College, before joining the navy as a special entry cadet in September 1926. Promoted to midshipman on 1 September 1927, he was posted to the cruiser  on the China Station in October 1927 and then to the battleship  in the Atlantic Fleet in April 1929. Promoted to sub-lieutenant on 1 November 1929 and to lieutenant on 1 December 1930, he joined the cruiser  in the Mediterranean Fleet in April 1931 before training as a gunnery specialist at the shore establishment  in 1934. After qualifying in gunnery, he was then made second gunnery officer of the battleship , flagship of the Home Fleet, in December 1934 before returning to HMS Excellent in 1936. He was appointed flotilla gunnery officer in the destroyer  in November 1937 and, having been promoted to lieutenant commander on 1 December 1938, he became gunnery officer of the  gun cruiser  in June 1939.

Second World War

It was on board the Glasgow that Begg first saw action in the Second World War: the Glasgow participated in North Atlantic convoys, the Norwegian campaign and the occupation of Iceland, before being badly damaged in a torpedo attack by Italian aircraft at Souda Bay in Crete in December 1940. In January 1941 he was appointed gunnery officer of the battleship  in the Mediterranean Fleet when it was flagship of the Commander-in-Chief, Admiral Sir Andrew Cunningham (soon to be First Sea Lord himself). Begg was in charge of Warspites main  guns during the Battle of Cape Matapan on the night of 28 March 1941. A third heavy cruiser, and two Italian destroyers were also sunk in the engagement. Begg was mentioned in despatches and awarded the Distinguished Service Cross for his part in the action. He was promoted to commander on 31 December 1942 and then went to the gunnery division in the Admiralty, where he remained until after the war.

Senior command
After the war, Begg joined the cruiser  as operations officer for the destroyers in the Mediterranean Fleet. Promoted to captain on 30 June 1947, he was given command of the gunnery school at Chatham in 1948 and of the destroyer  as captain of the 8th destroyer flotilla in August 1950. The Cossack took part in the Korean War being involved in the pre-invasion shelling and blockade of Inchon and Begg was mentioned in despatches and appointed to the Distinguished Service Order on 3 October 1952.

Begg was given command of the shore establishment  in April 1952 and officiated as the Officer Commanding the Naval Contingent at the Coronation of Queen Elizabeth II in June 1953. He went on to command the aircraft carrier  in December 1954. Having attended the Imperial Defence College, he was appointed Naval Aide-de-Camp to the Queen on 7 July 1956. Promoted to rear-admiral on 7 January 1957, he became Chief of Staff to the Commander-in-Chief, Portsmouth in February 1957 and went on to be Flag Officer, Second-in-Command, Far East Fleet in December 1958. Appointed Companion of the Order of the Bath in the 1959 New Year Honours and promoted to vice-admiral on 21 May 1960, he became Vice Chief of the Naval Staff in January 1961. He was advanced to Knight Commander of the Order of the Bath in the 1962 New Year Honours. Promoted full admiral on 8 March 1963, on appointment as Commander-in-Chief of Far East Command and British military adviser to the South East Asia Treaty Organization, at a time of when President Sukarno of Indonesia was stepping up pressure on Malaysia. Advanced to Knight Grand Cross of the Order of the Bath in the 1965 Birthday Honours and appointed an honorary Commander of the Malaysian Order of the Defender of the Realm, he went on to be Commander-in-Chief, Portsmouth in August 1965.

Begg was appointed First Sea Lord and Chief of the Naval Staff, following the sudden resignation of his predecessor Sir David Luce, in March 1966. Begg strongly believed that the future of the Navy depended as much on surface-to-air missiles as on naval air power and he vehemently opposed plans to introduce large new aircraft carriers. Instead he managed to persuade the British Government to develop the design for three small "through-deck cruisers". He was promoted to Admiral of the Fleet on his retirement on 12 August 1968. He became a Knight of the Order of St John in March 1969.

Later career
In March 1969 Begg was appointed Governor of Gibraltar where a residential development is still named after him. He left Gibraltar in 1973 and retired to his home at Stockbridge in Hampshire. His interests included fishing, gardening and sports – during his naval career he had been President of the Combined Services Winter Sports Association and President of Royal Navy Cricket. He suffered from Alzheimer's disease and died at Headbourne Worthy in Hampshire on 13 July 1995.

Family
In 1943 he married Rosemary Cowan; they had two sons.

References

Sources
 
 

|-
 

|-

|-
 

|-

 

1908 births
1995 deaths
People from Kensington
People educated at Malvern College
First Sea Lords and Chiefs of the Naval Staff
Governors of Gibraltar
Knights Grand Cross of the Order of the Bath
Companions of the Distinguished Service Order
Knights of the Order of St John
Recipients of the Distinguished Service Cross (United Kingdom)
Royal Navy admirals of the fleet
Royal Navy officers of World War II
Royal Navy personnel of the Korean War
British military personnel of the Indonesia–Malaysia confrontation
Deaths from Alzheimer's disease
Deaths from dementia in England
Graduates of the Royal College of Defence Studies
Military personnel from London
Lords of the Admiralty